William Pope, 1st Earl of Downe (1573 – 2 June 1631), known as Sir William Pope, 1st Baronet from 1611 to 1628, was an English peer.

Pope was the son of John Pope and Elizabeth Brocket, daughter of Sir John Brocket. He was a nephew of Sir Thomas Pope and he inherited his extensive estates in Oxfordshire. In 1601 he was appointed High Sheriff of Oxfordshire, and he was made a Knight of the Bath at the coronation of James VI and I as King of England in 1603. On 29 June 1611 he was created a baronet, of Wilcote in the Baronetage of England. In 1618, Pope completed the reconstruction of the family seat at Wroxton Abbey in the Jacobean style at a cost of £6,000. The house was subsequently visited by King James I as a guest of Pope.

In 1628, Pope purchased an earldom in the Irish Peerage for £2,500, and he was created Earl of Downe and Baron Pope of Belturbet on 16 October that year.

He married Anne Hopton, daughter of Sir Owen Hopton, in 1595. Upon his death in 1631, Pope was succeeded in his title by his grandson, Thomas Pope; Pope's eldest son, the politician Sir William Pope, having predeceased him. He was buried in Wroxton church, where he shares an elaborate memorial with his wife.

References

|-

1573 births
1631 deaths
17th-century English landowners
Earls in the Peerage of Ireland
High Sheriffs of Oxfordshire
Knights of the Bath
Peers of Ireland created by Charles I
People from Oxfordshire